John Holcroft was a 17th-century politician.

John Holcroft may also refer to:

John Holcroft (16th-century MP), for Lancashire
John de Holcroft, 14th-century MP for Lancashire

See also
Holcroft (surname)